Sianoa Smit-McPhee is an Australian actress. She is best known for her years in Australian soap opera Neighbours as Bree Timmins.

Early life
Sianoa Smit-McPhee was born in South Australia. She showed an interest in performing at a very young age, inspired by her father, actor and former professional wrestler Andy McPhee. She was singing, dancing, acting, and modelling by the age of three. When she was seven, she moved to Melbourne with her parents and her younger brother, actor Kodi Smit-McPhee.

Career 

Smit-McPhee played Bree Timmins in the long-running Australian TV series Neighbours from 2005 to 2007.

Her next role was in the children's television series As the Bell Rings, which aired on the Disney Channel. In 2007, she appeared as Desma, the lead character in the short fantasy film Hugo. From 2009 to 2011, she starred in the HBO series Hung as Darby Drecker.

In 2012, Smit-McPhee featured in the TV movie American Broadcasting Company's Firelight and the series It's Always Sunny in Philadelphia. The following year, she starred in All Cheerleaders Die. Smit-McPhee and her husband John Rush, a music producer, also wrote and produced the song “Take a Bite of My Heart”, which was featured in the film and performed by her.

Filmography

References

External links

Living people
Actresses from Adelaide
Actresses from Melbourne
Australian expatriates in the United States
Australian child actresses
Australian soap opera actresses
Year of birth missing (living people)